The 2015 TCR International Series Sochi round was the seventh round of the 2015 TCR International Series season. It took place on 21 June at the Sochi Autodrom.

Jordi Gené won the first race, starting from pole position, and Stefano Comini gained the second one, both driving a SEAT León Cup Racer.

Success Ballast
Due to the results obtained in the previous round, Kevin Gleason received +30 kg, Gianni Morbidelli +20 kg and Pepe Oriola +10 kg.

Classification

Qualifying

Notes:
 — Jordi Gené's best lap time was deleted for exceeding track limits.

Race 1

Race 2

Notes:
 — Tomas Engström and Gianni Morbidelli were moved to the back of the grid because of a parc fermé infringement.

Standings after the event

Drivers' Championship standings

Teams' Championship standings

 Note: Only the top five positions are included for both sets of drivers' standings.

References

External links
TCR International Series official website

Sochi
TCR International Series